Shaista Gohir, Baroness Gohir  (born 27 February 1969) is a British women's rights campaigner. She leads the national charity, Muslim Women's Network UK (MWNUK). Her nomination by the House of Lords Appointments Commission as a Crossbench life peer was announced on 17 May 2022.

Personal life
Gohir's parents immigrated to England in the early 1960s and are originally from Daultala, Pakistan. Gohir is a mother to three children and lives in Hall Green.

Awards and honours
She was appointed Member of the Most Excellent Order of the British Empire (MBE) in the 2008 Birthday Honours for services to Muslim People and to Community Relations and Officer of the Most Excellent Order of the British Empire (OBE) in the 2016 Birthday Honours for services to Gender Equality and Women's Rights.

References

1969 births
Living people
British Muslim activists
British women activists
British politicians of Pakistani descent
Crossbench life peers
People's peers
Life peers created by Elizabeth II
Life peeresses created by Elizabeth II